A History of Violence is the sixth studio album by Philadelphia hip hop group Jedi Mind Tricks, released on November 11, 2008 on Babygrande Records. The album followed multiple summer releases from the Jedi Mind Tricks camp, including the group's first DVD, titled Divine Fire: The Story of Jedi Mind Tricks, and the Vinnie Paz-executive produced projects Jedi Mind Tricks presents Doap Nixon: Sour Diesel, Jedi Mind Tricks presents King Syze: The Labor Union, and Jedi Mind Tricks presents OuterSpace: God's Fury. The album's first single Monolith was released on October 2, 2008. Their second single Godflesh was released on their website and it featured King Magnetic and Block McCloud. The album features former Jedi Mind Tricks member Jus Allah's return to the group.

Sales
The album sold 4,451 units in its first week out.

Track listing
All songs are produced by Stoupe the Enemy of Mankind

Charts

Notes
 "Deathbed Doctrine" contains samples from "Last Dayz" by Onyx, "Rock On" by Funkdoobiest, "Da Graveyard" by Big L and "C.R.E.A.M." by Wu-Tang Clan.
 "Monolith" samples "Erotiko" by Eleftheria Arvanitaki
 "Trail of Lies" samples from "Land of Make Believe" by Bobby Sherman
The dialogue in "The Sixth Gate Shines No More (Interlude)" is sampled from the 1957 film version of the Canadian Stratford Festival production of the William Butler Yeats adaptation of the play Oedipus Rex by Sophocles. It is spoken by Douglas Rain, the voice of HAL 9000 in the 1968 film 2001: A Space Odyssey.

References

2008 albums
Jedi Mind Tricks albums
Babygrande Records albums